Takanea excisa is a species of moth of the  family Lasiocampidae. It is found in Taiwan.

The wingspan is 35–40 mm.

References

Moths described in 1910
Lasiocampidae
Moths of Japan